The Wright Liberator was a low-floor single-deck bus body built on Volvo B10L chassis by Wrightbus between 1996 and 1999.

Of the 146 built, 103 were purchased by National Express' Travel Dundee and Travel West Midlands subsidiaries. Eleven were purchased by Bus Éireann in Ireland.

The Liberator was succeeded in 1999 by the Renown on the Volvo B10BLE chassis.

References

External links

Low-floor buses
Vehicles introduced in 1996
Liberator